AL-Riggae is an area of the Al Farwaniyah Governorate in Kuwait City, Kuwait.
located in the southwest of the city centre. Al-Riggae area is distinguished by its location between the Fourth and Fifth Ring Road (its four borders between Al Andalus, Al-Rai, Ardiya and Al-Shuwaikh) It includes the Courts Complex and the Public Authority for Youth and Sports, and next to it the Avenues Mall, one of the largest markets in Kuwait. The region is divided into the old and the new Al-Riggae, with several plots

References 

Populated places in Kuwait
Districts of Al Farwaniyah Governorate